Mangalya Balam is a 1959 Indian Telugu-language romantic drama film, produced by D. Madhusudhana Rao under Annapurna Pictures banner and directed by Adurthi Subba Rao. It stars Savitri and Akkineni Nageswara Rao, with music composed by Master Venu. The film is a remake of the Bengali film Agni Pariksha, which was based on Ashapurna Devi's novel of the same name. It was simultaneously made by the same banner and director in Tamil as Manjal Mahimai.

Plot
The film begins, Zamindar Papa Rao (S. V. Ranga Rao) who resides in the city, Kanthamma his shrewish wife (Suryakantam) always ill-treats her mother-in-law Parvatamma (Kannamba) and Papa Rao couple has two children Suryam & Saroja (Baby Sasikala). In their village, Papa Rao's sister Seeta (G. Varalakshmi) lives with her husband Rangaiah (A. V. Subba Rao), son Chandra Shekar (Master Babji) and a rift erupted between families as Seeta married against her brother's wish. Once Parvatamma learns that Seeta is terminally ill, so, she immediately packs up along with Suryam & Saroja. After looking at Saroja, Seeta aspires for the reunion of families and pleads her mother to couple up Chandram & Saroja. Thereupon, Parvathamma gives a call for Papa Rao before he reaches Seeta is about to leave her last breath, so, to accomplish her wish Parvatamma jeopardizes and espousals the children. Being cognizant to it, furious Papa Rao leaves the place carrying Suryam & Saroja away when grief-stricken Seeta passes away. On transpired about it, an infuriate Kanthamma annuls through the court and deprives the wedding chain (Mangalsutram) of Saroja which is preserved by Suryam. Years roll by, Chandra Shekar (Akkineni Nageswara Rao) returns to his village completing his education when Parvatamma divulges regarding his childhood marriage and requests him to get back his wife. Right now, Chandram moves on the mission, gets acquainted with Saroja as Shekar with the help of his friend Kailasam (Relangi) and they love each other. Parallelly, a glimpse, Kailasam rescues Saroja's friend Meenakshi (Rajasulochana) while committing suicide as she spouses to be wedlock an old man and Saroja gives her shelter. After that, Kailasam & Meena too fall in love. At the point in time, Suryam (Ramana Murthy) reveals Saroja that she is already married and handovers the wedding chain threw away by their mother. At present, Saroja is in a dichotomy, but as an Indian woman complies to the marriage and keeps Chandram a distance. Meanwhile, Parvatamma health declines, so, Suryam brings her home. On the other side, Chandram makes various attempts to meet Saroja and Papa Rao necks him out knowing his identity. Ultimately, Saroja enlightens reality by Parvatamma and the couple rejoins. Here, stubborn Papa Rao & Kanthamma forcibly fix Saroja's alliance with Kailasam which Parvatamma opposes and quits. At this juncture, Chandram enacts a play, escapes with Saroja to the village, Papa Rao chases and in enrage tries to shoot them when, unfortunately, Parvathamma is wounded. Spotting it, Papa Rao realizes his mistake also rebukes Kanthamma. Finally, the movie ends a happy note with the reunion of the entire family.

Cast
Savitri as Saroja
Akkineni Nageswara Rao as Chandrasekhar
Rajasulochana as Meena
Relangi / K. A. Thangavelu as Kailasam 
Suryakantham as Kanthamma
S. V. Ranga Rao as Papa Rao
Kannamba  as Parvatamma
G. Varalakshmi as Seeta
Ramana Reddy as Achary
Ramana Murthy / K. Balaji as Dr. Suryam
A. V. Subba Rao as Rangaiah 
Dr. Sivaramakrishnaiah
Vangara

Soundtrack
The music was composed by Master Venu. He borrowed only one tune from the Bengali film's composer Anupam Ghatak, for the song "Penu Cheekataye Lokam" from its original version "Ke Tumi Amare Dako".

Telugu songsThe Telugu songs were written by Sri Sri, except for My Dear Meena, Chekkili Meeda and Tirupati Venkateswara, which were written by Kosaraju. Playback singers were Ghantasala, Madhavapeddi Satyam, P. Suseela, Jikki & K. Jamuna Rani.

Tamil Track List
Lyrics were penned by Udumalai Narayana Kavi and A. Maruthakasi.

Production
Bhavanarayana, producer of Meghasandesham suggested to Dukkipati Madhusudhana Rao to watch the Bengali film Agni Pariksha (1954). Madhusudhana bought the remake rights after being impressed with the film and approached Atreya to write the screenplay and dialogues for the film. One of the major changes the maker brought in was while in the original version the girl's father dies of shock, in Mangalya Balam, his character was retained till the last frame. Mangalya Balam was said to be the first Telugu film to shoot in Ooty and it was also Savitri's first visit to the hill town. The Tamil version Manjal Mahimai was simultaneously made retaining all the leading actors and technicians with two changes to the cast – K. A. Thangavelu and K. Balaji replacing Relangi and Ramanamurthy respectively.

Release
Mangalya Balam was released on 7 January 1959 and for the first time in the history of Telugu cinema, the hundred days function was held in an open arena, the Municipal High School grounds, Vijayawada with thousands of cine-fans participating and presided over by the then Chief Minister of Andhra Pradesh, Kasu Brahmananda Reddy. Manjal Mahimai was released on 14 January 1959 and ran for a hundred days.

Awards
National Film Awards
National Film Award for Best Feature Film in Telugu – 1959

References

External links
 

1959 films
1950s Telugu-language films
1950s Tamil-language films
Telugu remakes of Bengali films
Tamil remakes of Bengali films
Indian multilingual films
Films directed by Adurthi Subba Rao
Best Telugu Feature Film National Film Award winners
1950s multilingual films
Films based on Indian novels
Films based on works by Ashapurna Devi
Films scored by Master Venu